Jefferson City Community Center, also known as Duke Diggs Community Center, is a historic African-American community centre located at Jefferson City, Cole County, Missouri. It was built in 1942, and is a one-story, "T"-plan, stone building.

It was listed on the National Register of Historic Places in 1992.

References

Buildings and structures on the National Register of Historic Places in Missouri
African-American history of Missouri
Buildings and structures completed in 1942
Buildings and structures in Jefferson City, Missouri
National Register of Historic Places in Cole County, Missouri